The 2018 Bethune–Cookman Wildcats football team represented Bethune–Cookman University in the 2018 NCAA Division I FCS football season. They were led by fourth-year head coach Terry Sims and played their home games at the newly renamed Daytona Stadium. They were a member of the Mid-Eastern Athletic Conference (MEAC). They finished the season 7–5, 5–2 in MEAC play to finish in a tie for second place.

Previous season
The Wildcats finished the 2017 season 7–4, 6–2 in MEAC play to finish in a tie for second place.

Preseason

MEAC preseason poll
In a vote of the MEAC head coaches and sports information directors, the Wildcats were picked to finish in fourth place.

Preseason All-MEAC Teams
The Wildcats had five players selected to the preseason all-MEAC teams.

Offense

1st team

Dwayne Brown – OL

3rd team

Tupac Isme – RB

Defense

2nd team

Todney Evans – DL

3rd team

Kevin Thompson – DL

Special teams

1st team

Uriel Hernandez – K

Schedule

Source: Schedule

Game summaries

at Tennessee State

Virginia–Lynchburg

at Florida Atlantic

vs Howard

at Savannah State

Mississippi Valley State

at South Carolina State

North Carolina A&T

at Nebraska

at Morgan State

North Carolina Central

vs Florida A&M

References

Bethune-Cookman
Bethune–Cookman Wildcats football seasons